Khongoryn Els (Khongor Sand) also called Duut Mankhan is popularly known as the "Singing Sands". It lies within the Gobi Gurvansaikhan National Park in Mongolia. The sand dunes extend to over  area.

Location 
Travel through the desert is by vans.

Features 
They are similar to the dunes of Egypt. The sands have attractive curves which end in a sharp edge, making wave like patterns on the sand. They continually change shape due to wind and reflect yellow-white colours as the intensity of light changes during the day.

As the sand is moved due to winds or is in the process of collapse due to small avalanches, a strong sound is made giving it the name "Singing Sands." A French team has explained this phenomenon as due to a thin surface coating of slate over the sand grains which causes the sand to make a resonant sound. The sound is also attributed to heat, the weather conditions in the desert and to the avalanche effect caused by the sand particles moving harmoniously. This sound is also compared to the sound made by an aircraft during take-off and landing stages. Its length and width vary. The largest of these dunes is found in the northwestern end of the range.

The northern border of the dunes is skirted by a small river, the Khonggoryn Gol, where green pastures are noted. The river is sourced by subterranean flows from the mountains forming its valley. Grazing by camels and horses of the nomadic population of the area is noted. The wildlife recorded consist of Saker falcons, Pallas's sandgrouse and Saxaul sparrow, Corsac fox or red fox.

References

Bibliography 
 
 
 
 
 
 

Deserts of Mongolia
Ecoregions of Asia
Geography of Inner Mongolia
Biota of Mongolia